Albert Ross Eckler (May 22, 1901 – March 14, 1991) served as Deputy Director of the United States Census Bureau from 1949 to 1965, and its Director from 1965 until 1969. He was the first career employee ever to become director of the agency.

Career
Eckler was born in Van Hornesville, New York in 1901 and lived on a farm until he attended Hamilton College. He then earned a master's degree and a PhD at Harvard University in 1934. Eckler joined the Census Bureau in 1939 as chief of economic statistics in the Population Division. He then became assistant chief of the Population Division and then the Special Surveys Division and chief social scientist. In 1949, he became Deputy Director and in 1965 President Lyndon B. Johnson appointed him director. He worked as director until 1969 and later died in Maryland in 1991.

He authored The Bureau of the Census, and was president of the American Statistical Association. He is also the father of logologist and centenarian researcher A. Ross Eckler, Jr.

References

External links
US Census Bureau oral history program interview
Video that cites a paper by Eckler on Jotto

1901 births
1991 deaths
American statisticians
Presidents of the American Statistical Association
Fellows of the American Statistical Association
United States Census Bureau people
Harvard University alumni
20th-century American mathematicians
Hamilton College (New York) alumni
Mathematicians from New York (state)
Lyndon B. Johnson administration personnel